Jiří Linhart (13 April 1924 – 6 January 2011) was a Czech swimmer. He competed in the men's 200 metre breaststroke at the 1948 Summer Olympics.

References

External links
 

1924 births
2011 deaths
Czech male swimmers
Olympic swimmers of Czechoslovakia
Swimmers at the 1948 Summer Olympics
Male breaststroke swimmers
Sportspeople from Prague